Malays in Egypt make up a part of the overseas Malay race population. Malay speakers who came to Egypt are mainly from Indonesia and Malaysia. In 1927, they started a newspaper, Seruan Azhar.

References

Asian diaspora in Egypt
Ethnic groups in Egypt
Indonesian diaspora
Malay diaspora
Malaysian diaspora